Sponk! is a children's television game show produced by Sesame Workshop and Insight Productions for the Noggin channel. It was Sesame Workshop's first original production for Noggin, which began as a joint venture between Sesame Workshop and Nickelodeon. It premiered on Noggin on September 10, 2001 and ended on March 4, 2002. The series reran on Nickelodeon on Sunday mornings, starting September 16.

The premise of Sponk! was improvisational comedy, similar to the show Whose Line Is It Anyway?  Two teams of performers depicted suggestions in a variety of games.  Viewers suggested their ideas by submitting them to the Noggin website.  "SID" (Suggestion & Idea Distributor) was the name of the computer on the show that picked the ideas submitted by Noggin.com members. From 2002 to 2004, Noggin aired reruns of Sponk! as part of its nighttime programming block, The N.

Cast
The cast included host Johnathan McClain, and announcer (as the voice of SID) Karen Fowler.  The performers were all young actors.  Among them were Julia Kay, Tim Dorsch, Scott Irby-Rainnar, Lori Wells, Miles Thompson (who later went on to star in the feature film Me and You and Everyone We Know and cameoed in Return To Sleepaway Camp), Allie Berdebes, Vanessa Lengies, and Louie Torrellas.

Gameplay

It resembled a classic Nickelodeon game show, featuring young actors and a young studio audience. The performers were four boys and four girls but with two sitting out and six competing in a red team and blue team. The ideas for the improvisational and sketch contests were submitted by the home audience through Noggin.com. SID would then pick a submission and provide credit for the home audience (as their screen name). Later, She announced the winner of a small electronic device.

The studio audience participated as judges for the sketches. They disqualified a contestant by yelling out, "Sponk!". When time ran out, the audience voted the winner by raising the side of their "Spaddle" to vote for the red team or blue team. Occasionally an audience member would be the sketch  participant while the original performers acted as a celebrity panel, and won a small prize for Participating.

References

External links 

Sponk! on SesameWorkshop.org

Noggin (brand) original programming
The N original programming
2000s American children's comedy television series
2000s American children's game shows
2000s American comedy game shows
2000s American sketch comedy television series
2001 American television series debuts
2002 American television series endings
2000s Canadian children's television series
2000s Canadian game shows
2000s Canadian sketch comedy television series
2001 Canadian television series debuts
2002 Canadian television series endings
American children's education television series
Canadian children's comedy television series
Canadian children's education television series
Children's sketch comedy
English-language television shows
Improvisational television series
Television series about teenagers
Television series by Insight Productions
Television series by Sesame Workshop